Chico Hamilton Trio is an album by drummer and bandleader Chico Hamilton, recorded at sessions in 1953, 1954 and 1956 released on the Pacific Jazz label. The album features Hamilton's first recordings for Pacific Jazz from 1953 and 1954, six tracks originally released on a 10-inch album, along with an additional four recordings from 1956.

Reception

The AllMusic review by Michael G. Nastos states: "An entry point recording for Chico Hamilton, it displays his savory good common sense well before being more trend and fashion conscious, as psychedelia and fusion took over commercialized jazz."

Track listing
 "Blues on the Rocks" (George Duvivier) - 3:05
 "Street of Drums" (Chico Hamilton) - 3:20
 "We'll Be Together Again" (Carl T. Fischer, Frankie Laine) - 2:50
 "Skinned Strings" (Hamilton, Duvivier) - 5:12
 "Nuttye" (Jimmy Cheatham) - 2:27
 "Porch Light" (Duvivier) - 3:58
 "Broadway" (Billy Bird, Teddy McRae, Henri Woode) - 3:03
 "Autumn Landscape" (Duvivier) - 3:45
 "Uganda" (Hamilton, Duvivier) - 4:45
 "Lollypop" (Gerald Wiggins, Hamilton) - 2:14
Recorded at Sound Stage Studio, Hollywood on December 6, 1953 (tracks 2, 5 & 7) and October 2, 1954 (tracks 3, 9 & 10) and Music Box Theatre, Hollywood, on  February 8, 1956 (tracks 1, 4, 6 & 8)

Personnel
Chico Hamilton - drums
Jim Hall (tracks 1, 4, 6 & 8), Howard Roberts (tracks 2, 3, 5, 7, 9 & 10) - guitar
George Duvivier - bass

References 

Pacific Jazz Records albums
Chico Hamilton albums
1956 albums